Give 'Em Hell may refer to:

 Give 'Em Hell (Sebastian Bach album), 2014
 Give 'Em Hell (Witchfynde album) or the title song, 1980